Île Longue is one of the Kerguelen Islands situated near to the south-east coast of Grande Terre, the principal island.

The highest point is a mountain named Pic d'Antoine, at 270 metres.

Since 1950 the islands hosts about 3500 free range sheep bred in order to provide fresh meat to the Port-aux-Français settlement.

References
 Kerguelen islands map, Géoportail IGN.
 General view of non-metropolitan France, Maison de la Géographie.

Longue